Mammillaria vetula is a species of cactus in the subfamily Cactoideae. It is endemic to the Mexican states of Hidalgo, Guanajuato and Querétaro.

References

Plants described in 1832
vetula